WAHS (89.5 FM, "Avondale Community Radio") is a radio station broadcasting a variety format. Licensed to Auburn Hills, Michigan, it first began broadcasting in November 1975. As of 2021, the station manager is Marty Shafer. The station serves as both a public station and a learning tool for young students attending Avondale High School. In 2016 WAHS expanded programming to feature both locally produced and nationally syndicated programs as well as Avondale sports coverage.  They also re-branded their slogan from "The Station for Alteration" to "Avondale Community Radio."  In 2017, they received a Michigan Association of Broadcasters award for High School Radio Station of the Year.

References 
Michiguide.com - WAHS History
WAHS Facebook

External links 

AHS
Radio stations established in 1975